Plagens is a surname. Notable people with the surname include:

Joseph C. Plagens (1880–1943), Polish-born American Roman Catholic bishop
Peter Plagens (born 1941), American artist, art critic, and novelist